Chaenopsis megalops is a species of chaenopsid blenny found around Colombia, in the western central Atlantic Ocean.

References
 Smith-Vaniz, W. F. 2000 (29 Dec.) [ref. 25062] A new species of pikeblenny, Chaenopsis megalops, from the southwestern Caribbean (Teleostei: Chaenopsidae). Proceedings of the Biological Society of Washington v. 113 (no. 4): 918–925.

megalops
Fish described in 2000